Ursula Hegi (born May 23, 1946) is a German-born American writer. She is currently an instructor in the MFA program at Stony Brook Southampton.

She was born Ursula Koch in 1946 in Düsseldorf, Germany, a city that was heavily bombed during World War II.  Her perception growing up was that the war was avoided as a topic of discussion despite its evidence everywhere, and The Holocaust was a particularly taboo topic.  This had a strong effect on her later writing and her feelings about her German identity.

She left West Germany in 1964, at the age of 18.  She moved to the United States in 1965, where she married (becoming Ursula Hegi) in 1967 and became a naturalized citizen the same year.  In 1979, she graduated from the University of New Hampshire with both a bachelor's and master's degree.  She was divorced in 1984. The same year, she was hired at Eastern Washington University, in Cheney, Washington, near Spokane, Washington, where she became an Associate Professor and taught creative writing and contemporary literature.

Hegi's first books were set in the United States.  She set her third, Floating in My Mother's Palm, in the fictional German town of "Burgdorf," using her writing to explore her conflicted feelings about her German heritage.  She used the setting for three more books, including her best selling novel Stones from the River, which was chosen for Oprah's Book Club in 1997.  Hegi appeared on The Oprah Winfrey Show on April 8, and her publisher reprinted 1.5 million hardcover copies and 500,000 paperbacks.  She subsequently moved from Spokane to New York City.

Hegi's many awards include an NEA Fellowship and five PEN Syndicated Fiction Awards.  She won a book award from the Pacific Northwest Booksellers Association (PNBA) in 1991 for Floating in My Mother's Palm.  She has also had two New York Times Notable Book mentions.  She has written many book reviews for The New York Times, the Los Angeles Times, and The Washington Post.

Bibliography

Novels
Intrusions (1981)
Floating in My Mother's Palm (1990)
Stones from the River (1994)
Salt Dancers (1995)
The Vision of Emma Blau (2000)
Sacred Time (2003)
The Worst Thing I've Done (2007)
Children and Fire (2011)
The Patron Saint of Pregnant Girls (2020)

Short stories
Unearned Pleasures and Other Stories (1988)
Hotel of the Saints (2001)

Children's books
Trudi & Pia (2003), with pictures by Gisele Potter

Non-fiction
Tearing the Silence: On Being German in America (1998)

References 

20th-century American novelists
21st-century American novelists
American women novelists
Eastern Washington University faculty
Writers from Spokane, Washington
University of New Hampshire alumni
Writers from Düsseldorf
German emigrants to the United States
1946 births
Living people
20th-century American women writers
21st-century American women writers
PEN/Faulkner Award for Fiction winners
Novelists from Washington (state)
American women academics